The Battle of Rawa was one of skirmishes of the Polish January Uprising. It took place on 4 February 1863 in the town of Rawa Mazowiecka, Russian-controlled Congress Poland. A unit of Polish insurgents under Antoni Jeziorański, and Aleksander and Franciszek Sokołowski, managed to capture barracks of the Imperial Russian Army. The remaining Russians retreated towards Skierniewice. With several pieces of weaponry and an unknown number of prisoners, the Poles then headed southwards.

References

Battles of the January Uprising
Conflicts in 1863
February 1863 events